This is a list of programs currently or previously broadcast by Travel Channel, an American cable television network devoted to travel; Discovery, Inc. serves as the majority owner and owns a 65% stake in the network, with cable television provider Cox Communications owning the remaining 35%.

Current programming

Aired regularly
Adam Richman's Best Sandwich in America, a show where Adam Richman attempts to find the best sandwich in America by trying sandwiches throughout the country and pitting them against each other
Airport 24/7: Miami, created and produced by 2C Media, chronicles the daily life of the staff at Miami International Airport
The Alaska Triangle
Alien Highway
Amazing Eats, re-edited footage from Man v. Food, grouped by theme rather than city
America Declassified
Anthony Bourdain: No Reservations, an award-winning reality series hosted by Anthony Bourdain that is a fusion of cooking and travel shows
Baggage Battles
Bert the Conqueror, presented by Bert Kreischer as he takes on big thrills while traveling across America
Bizarre Foods America, a spin-off of Bizarre Foods, this time focusing on the United States rather than international travel
Bizarre Foods with Andrew Zimmern, a reality series hosted by Andrew Zimmern that focuses on weird and unique cuisines of different cultures and also incorporates some off-beat tourist destinations
Booze Traveler
Buried Worlds with Don Wildman
Chowdown Countdown
Church Secrets & Legends
Code of the Wild
Daytripper, Travel Channel's weekday daytime programming block which features a variety of repeat showings from the network as well as travel themed programming from Food Network
The Dead Files, a paranormal series that features psychic medium Amy Allan and former NYPD homicide detective Steve DiSchiavi as they investigate locations that are reported to be haunted
Destination Fear, documentary filmmaker Dakota Laden and his crew travel across the country in an RV to spend nights in haunted locations. The crew takes a new approach to the paranormal with participants sleeping solo overnight at each haunted location and recording their experiences. The show sets out to portray real-life events and the psychological impacts these paranormal hauntings have on each member of the team.
Dhani Tackles the Globe, a show hosted by Cincinnati Bengals middle linebacker Dhani Jones as he travels around the world to participate in national sports of countries; these sports are not normally played, or sometimes even known about, by Americans
Edge of America, a culture and travel show hosted by Geoff Edgers, showcasing bizarre and unique forms of American entertainment and food
Eli Roth Presents: A Ghost Ruined My Life
Expedition Bigfoot
Famously Afraid
Ghost Adventures, a paranormal series following four ghost hunters (Zak Bagans, Aaron Goodwin, Billy Tolley and Jay Wasley) as they investigate reportedly haunted places around the US and abroad
Ghost Adventures: Quarantine
Ghost Adventures: Serial Killer Spirits
Ghost Brothers: Haunted Houseguests
Ghost Loop
Ghost Nation, a paranormal series following former members of Ghost Hunters, Jason Hawes, Steve Gonsalves, and Dave Tango as they help paranormal researchers in their investigations across the United States.
Ghosts of Morgan City
Haunting in the Heartland
The Holzer Files
Hometown Horror
Hotel Impossible, Anthony Melchiorri visits hotels in need and tries to help them by redesigning the rooms and other areas of the hotel
Hotel Paranormal
Insane Coaster Wars, hosted by coaster experts who count down and talk about the most insane coasters throughout the world
Into the Unknown
Kindred Spirits, a paranormal series following former members of Ghost Hunters, Amy Bruni and Adam Berry as they investigate residences to determine if recurring paranormal activity is tied to the families living there
The Layover, a reality series hosted by Anthony Bourdain that explores places to go and eat in a city within 24 to 48 hours
Lost in the Wild
Lost Secrets
Most Terrifying Places
Mountain Monsters
My Horror Story
Mysteries at the Castle
Mysteries at the Monument
Mysteries at the Museum, hosted by Don Wildman who reveals the stories behind museum artifacts of unusual or mysterious origins
Mysteries at the National Parks
Paranormal Caught on Camera
Portals to Hell, a paranormal series that follows Jack Osbourne and Katrina Weidman exploring haunted locations, searching for irrefutable evidence that a spirit world exists.
Ripley's Believe It or Not!
Samantha Brown's Great Weekends
Sand Masters, a reality show (only airs on Sundays) where the most unusual sand sculptures are made
Strange World
Top Spot, a travel show featuring three hotels where vacationers choose the best hotel
Trending Fear
Trip Flip, hosted by Bert Kreischer; he offers free vacations to an unknown travel location
True Terror with Robert Englund
Witches of Salem
Xtreme Waterparks, an extreme look at some of the wildest water park slides in the world
The Zimmern List, hosted by Andrew Zimmern who shares his personal recommendations on the food and places he loves to eat

Specials
Travel Channel Uncut takes the "bloopers" from the shows listed above and makes them into an episode/special of this series.

Aired occasionally or previously
5 Takes, a reality show that lets viewers control the action
Adventure Bound
Appalachian Stories, a documentary series about Appalachia, originally produced and shown in Knoxville, Tennessee, as The Heartland Series
Are You Game?, game show host Todd Newton travels to Japan to appear on the game show Urakage
Arthur Frommer's Almanac of Travel
Bite Me with Dr. Mike, in which virologist Dr. Mike Leahy experiences close encounters with some of Earth's most dangerous creatures
Bizarre Collections (special), visits five unusual collections: Anthony Toth's airline memorabilia; Bob Grove's airline barf bags; Audra Kunkle's collection of the macabre; Rich and Flo Newman's toilet paper samples; and Richard and Judith Lang's art made from beach trash
Bridget's Sexiest Beaches, in which Bridget Marquardt searches for the most beautiful beaches in the world
Caprice's Travels, a series following the host Caprice as she travels around the world
Cash and Treasures, hosted by Kirsten Gum, features places around the United States and the world where the public can dig for valuable gemstones and artifacts
Castles of Horror, a documentary series that journeys to castles from all across Europe
Cruises We Love!, a 12-episode series that showcases everything from mainstream cruise lines to exclusive ships
Culture Shock, a program hosted by Shenaz Treasurywala, showing "peculiar customs and bizarre traditions" of various cultures around the world
Distant Shores, featuring the couple Paul and Sheryl Shard sailing to interesting or exotic places
Dream Riders, in which a father takes his son on a 4,000-mile bike journey across America in an effort to rebuild their relationship
Drew Carey's Sporting Adventures, a show hosted by comedian Drew Carey as he travels the world photographing association football matches
Extreme, showcases everything extreme, from swimming pools to very large ants
Flight Attendant School
Food Heavens
Food Paradise, finds the ultimate food paradises in America
Food Wars, a show where food feuds are settled
Forbes Luxe 11, a glimpse at 11 escapes for the super affluent
Fred Willard's American Festivals
Get Packing
Globe Trekker
Great Getaway Game
Great Hotels, a reality series hosted by Samantha Brown that checks into hotels all over the country deemed as "great" values and stays
Great Park Adventures, hosted by Russell Shimooka, shows adventures at North American national parks
Great Sports Vacations
Hotel Impossible: Showdown, a spin-off of Hotel Impossible where successful hoteliers compete for a prize of $25,000
Joan Cusack's Local Flavor
Journeys to Remember
Lawrence of America, a show hosted by English-born journalist Lawrence Beldon-Smythe that exposes America and its subculture
Lonely Planet Six Degrees
Made in America, hosted by John Ratzenberger, features stories of the best people, places, and products in the US
Madventures, a Finnish travel show that focuses on low-budget backpacking
Man v. Food, a show where Adam Richman partakes in food competitions
Man v. Food Nation, the fourth season of Man v. Food, in which Adam Richman coaches others to take on food competitions
Mark & Olly: Living with the Tribes, a reality series that follows Olly Steeds and Mark Anstice as they live with the Mek and the Kombai people
Meet the Natives
Metropolis, a mini-series featuring the culture and history of major metropolitan cities in the world.
Most Haunted, follows the Most Haunted team to the scariest sites in their home country, the UK
Mysteries at the Hotel
Mysteries and Myths with Megan Fox
Not Your Average Travel Guide, a series that attempts to give an unconventional personal tour of the world; also featured during the show are small travel tips and facts
Off Limits, host Don Wildman ventures through unexplored or forgotten parts of iconic American cities to reveal their "untold stories and secrets"
The Osbournes Want to Believe
Passport to Europe, a show hosted by Samantha Brown that tours cities of Europe
Passport to Green Getaways, a special hosted by Samantha Brown that shows vacations to three eco-friendly destinations in North America
Passport to Latin America, a show hosted by Samantha Brown that tours cities of Latin America
Road Trip
Slice of Brooklyn
Stranded with Cash Peters
Super Swank, a series which features luxurious lifestyles
Surf Patrol, follows Australian lifeguards as they patrol some of the most dangerous and beautiful beaches
Taste of America, hosted by Mark DeCarlo
Toy Hunter
Travellers
Treasure Hunter: Kirsten Gum, hosted by Kirsten Gum, features places around the United States and the world where the public can dig for valuable gemstones and artifacts
Treasure Hunters
Tribal Life, features indigenous peoples of different tribes
Tribal Life: Meet the Namal, follows the Namal tribe in Vanuatu
Truck Stop USA
Vacation Home Search, a show in the style of House Hunters, in which a couple tours three possible vacation homes and purchases one of them.
Vegas Revolution, a behind-the-scenes look at Las Vegas, Nevada
Weird Travels
When Vacations Attack, a reality documentary show where a survivor (or survivors) escape from a horrific disaster or accident
The Wild Within, a show hosted by Steven Rinell who reveals his deep conviction that within all of us, an instinctual hunter/gatherer is waiting to come out
World Poker Tour, which moved to Game Show Network in 2008
World's Best
World's Lost Tribes
World's Most Dangerous Places

Future programming
Fountain Kings, an upcoming docu-series following the accomplishments and challenges experienced by designers, engineers and builders behind some of the world's most recognizable water fountains by WET Design

References

Travel Channel